The sixth season of La Voz Kids premiered on 7 May 2021 on Antena 3. David Bisbal, Rosario Flores, Vanesa Martín and Melendi remained as the coaches of the show. Eva González and Juanra Bonet also returned for their second season as hosts. 

Levi Díaz from Team Melendi was announced the winner, marking Melendi’s second and final victory as a coach.

Coaches and hosts 

In this season, Rosario Flores, Melendi, Vanesa Martin and David Bisbal are returning coaches from the previous season. However, Eva González remains the main host of the program together with Juanra Bonet who serves as backstage host,.

Also, the coaches' mentors changed in this season. Bisbal's team adviser would be Aitana, Beret for team Melendi, Blas Cantó for Team Vanesa, and Rozalén for team Rosario.

Teams 

  Winner
  Runner-up
  Third place
  Fourth place
  Eliminated in the Finale
  Eliminated in the Semi-final
  Eliminated in the Knockouts
  Stolen in the Battles
  Eliminated in the Battles

Blind auditions 
Blind auditions started on 7 May. Each coach is given two blocks to prevent another coach in getting the contestant to its team and; when the coach is blocked, the chair won't turn around.

Episode 1 (7 May)

Episode 2 (14 May)

Episode 3 (21 May) 

: Rosario tried block David, but he did not turn and therefore got a second chance to block.

Episode 4 (28 May)

Episode 5 (4 June)

Episode 6 (11 June)

Battles 
The battles round started on 18 June. The coaches can steal one losing artist from other coaches. In addition, coaches' advisors help them on deciding who will be advancing to the next round; Aitana for Team David Bisbal, Rozalén for Team Rosario, Blas Cantó for Team Vanesa and Beret for Team Melendi. Contestants who won their battle or were stolen by another coach advanced to the Knockouts.

Knockouts 
The knockouts round aired on 9 July. Known as "El Ultimo Asalto" in Spanish, in this round each teams' six participants perform, and the coaches select only four to advance for the semi-final. The advisors from the battles continued to help the coaches in their choices.

Final phase

Week 1: Semi-final (16 July)

Week 2: Finale (23 July)

Round one

Round two

Elimination chart

Color key 
Artist's info

  Team David
  Team Rosario
  Team Vanesa
  Team Melendi

Result details

  Winner
  Runner-up
  Third place
  Fourth place
  Saved by her/his coach
  Eliminated

Overall

Teams

References 

Spain
2021 Spanish television seasons